The John Doyle House, at 339 Park in the historic mining town of Park City, Utah, was built around 1900.

Background
It is a frame "two story box" house, with a pyramid roof, one of just four in Park City identified in a 1984 study, all four being along Park Avenue.

It was listed on the National Register of Historic Places in 1986.

References

National Register of Historic Places in Summit County, Utah
Houses completed in 1900